Nancy Gbana Abudu (born 1974) is an American lawyer from Georgia. She is a nominee to serve as a United States circuit judge of the United States Court of Appeals for the Eleventh Circuit.

Early life and education 

Abudu was born and raised in Alexandria, Virginia, the daughter of immigrants from Ghana. After graduating from Mercersburg Academy in 1992, she earned a Bachelor of Arts degree from Columbia University in 1996 and a Juris Doctor from Tulane University Law School in 1999.

Career 

From 1999 to 2001, Abudu was an associate at Skadden, Arps, Slate, Meagher & Flom. From 2002 to 2004, she served as a staff attorney for the United States Court of Appeals for the Eleventh Circuit. From 2005 to 2013, she was a staff attorney at the ACLU Voting Rights Project. From 2013 to 2019, she was the legal director for the American Civil Liberties Union of Florida. During her time with the ACLU, Abudu specialized in voting rights law. Since 2019, she has worked as the deputy legal director and interim director for strategic litigation at the Southern Poverty Law Center.

Notable cases 

In 2009, Abudu was co-counsel for Debra L. Harvey and Catherine M. Beddard who challenged Arizona's felon-restoration statute. Arizona's Constitution provides: "No person who is adjudicated an incapacitated person shall be qualified to vote at any election, nor shall any person convicted of treason or felony, be qualified to vote at any election unless restored to civil rights." The plaintiffs brought suits challenging Arizona's disenfranchisement scheme, arguing the law violated the Equal Protection Clause of the Fourteenth Amendment to the United States Constitution.

In 2016, Abudu was co-counsel for The League of Women Voters of Florida in a lawsuit, claiming that the congressional redistricting plan adopted by the Florida Legislature violated Article III, Section 20 of the Florida Constitution, by “favoring the Republican Party and its incumbents.” Article III, Section 20 was added to the Florida Constitution on November 2, 2010, following the general election and provides in subsection (a) that "[n]o apportionment plan or individual district shall be drawn with the intent to favor or disfavor a political party or an incumbent...."

In 2017, Abudu was co-counsel for The Gainesville Woman Care LLC in a case against the state of Florida. They challenged the 2015 amendment to Florida's informed consent law for termination of pregnancies that created a 24–hour waiting period.

Nomination to court of appeals 

On December 23, 2021, President Joe Biden announced his intent to nominate Abudu to serve as a United States Circuit Judge of the United States Court of Appeals for the Eleventh Circuit. On January 10, 2022, her nomination was sent to the Senate. President Biden nominated Abudu to the seat vacated by Judge Beverly B. Martin, who retired on September 30, 2021. On April 27, 2022, a hearing on her nomination was held before the Senate Judiciary Committee. On May 26, 2022, the Judiciary Committee deadlocked on her nomination by a 11–11 vote. On January 3, 2023, her nomination was returned to the President under Rule XXXI, Paragraph 6 of the United States Senate; she was renominated later the same day. On February 9, 2023, her nomination was reported out of committee by an 11–10 vote. Her nomination is pending before the United States Senate. If confirmed, Abudu would be the first African-American woman to sit on the Eleventh Circuit.

See also 
 Joe Biden judicial appointment controversies
 Joe Biden Supreme Court candidates

References

External links 

 

1974 births
Living people
20th-century American women lawyers
20th-century American lawyers
21st-century American women lawyers
21st-century American lawyers
American Civil Liberties Union people
American people of Ghanaian descent
Columbia University alumni
Florida lawyers
Georgia (U.S. state) lawyers
Lawyers from Alexandria, Virginia
Mercersburg Academy alumni
Skadden, Arps, Slate, Meagher & Flom people
Tulane University Law School alumni